Harpal Singh (born 31 March 1983), known professionally as Preet Harpal, is an Indian singer songwriter and actor associated with Punjabi language music and films.

Career
Harpal made his debut with album Hasle Vairne Hasle in 1999.  His second album Begane Taan Begane Hunde Ne makes vocals of Sad Love songs.  In his acting career he debuted with film Sirphire His first film is Sirphire starring himself and Gurleen Chopra, Monica Bedi Roshan Prince which was released in 2010. Preet harpal has done second movie my self pendu with upasna singh,syali Bhagat,Jaswinder bhalla and third movie has done with guggu gill,yograj singh,mandy TAKHAR,karamjit Anmol. Etc

Discography

Filmography

References

Living people
Punjabi-language singers
Bhangra (music) musicians
1975 births